The 1997 Reading Borough Council election was held on 1 May 1997, at the same time as other local elections across England and Northern Ireland, and on the same day as the general election. All of the 45 seats on Reading Borough Council were up for election, rather than the usual third of the seats. This was in preparation for the local government reorganisation in Berkshire which saw Berkshire County Council abolished and its functions transferred to the six district councils, including Reading, with effect from 1 April 1998. The elections to Berkshire County Council which would ordinarily have been held in 1997 were cancelled. Some outgoing members of Berkshire County Council used the opportunity to seek a seat on the borough council for the first time, including the leader of the Labour group on the county council, Lawrence Silverman.

Whilst Labour's share of the vote fell slightly compared to 1996, Labour increased its number of seats to 36 out of the 45 seats on the council. David Sutton remained leader of the Labour group and leader of the council. The Liberal Democrats, led by Ian Fenwick, remained the second largest party with six seats. The Conservative group was reduced to just three seats. It was led into the election by Ed Young, but he did not stand for re-election as he was standing to be a Member of Parliament in Leigh (in which he was unsuccessful). Fred Pugh was appointed leader of the Conservative group after the election.

Results

Ward results
The results in each ward were as follows (candidates with an asterisk* were the previous incumbent standing for re-election):

References

1997 English local elections
1997